Johannes ("John") Maria van Loen (born 4 February 1965 in Utrecht) is a Dutch former professional footballer who played as a  striker. he earned seven caps for the Netherlands national football team, with which he scored one goal. He played in the 1986 FIFA World Cup Qualification and the 1990 FIFA World Cup in Italy.

Career statistics

Club

International

Honours
Utrecht
KNVB Cup: 1984–85

Anderlecht
Belgian First Division: 1990–91

Ajax
UEFA Cup: 1991-92
Johan Cruyff Shield: 1993

Feyenoord
Eredivisie: 1992-93
KNVB Cup: 1993–94, 1994–95

References

External links
 
 
 CV John van Loen 

1965 births
Living people
Dutch footballers
Dutch expatriate footballers
Netherlands international footballers
Netherlands under-21 international footballers
Dutch football managers
Association football forwards
Feyenoord players
AFC Ajax players
FC Utrecht players
Roda JC Kerkrade players
Eredivisie players
Belgian Pro League players
1990 FIFA World Cup players
R.S.C. Anderlecht players
APOEL FC players
Sanfrecce Hiroshima players
Expatriate footballers in Japan
Dutch expatriate sportspeople in Japan
J1 League players
Footballers from Utrecht (city)
Expatriate footballers in Cyprus
Expatriate footballers in Belgium
UEFA Cup winning players